Bayki (Bayqı) is a rural locality (a selo) and the administrative centre of Baykinsky Selsoviet, Karaidelsky District, Bashkortostan, Russia. The population was 1,095 as of 2010. There are 21 streets.

Geography 
Bayki is located 9 km west of Karaidel (the district's administrative centre) by road. Karaidel is the nearest rural locality.

References 

Rural localities in Karaidelsky District